Pietà is a 1571-1576 painting by El Greco, produced just after his arrival in Rome and with clear influence from Michelangelo, although the triangular composition is El Greco's own invention. In the background is a landscape scene. It is now in the Philadelphia Museum of Art.

Bibliography 
  ÁLVAREZ LOPERA, José, El Greco, Madrid, Arlanza, 2005, Biblioteca «Descubrir el Arte», (colección «Grandes maestros»). .
  SCHOLZ-HÄNSEL, Michael, El Greco, Colonia, Taschen, 2003. .

External links
 
  

Paintings by El Greco
1570s paintings
Paintings in the collection of the Philadelphia Museum of Art
El Greco